58th meridian may refer to:

58th meridian east, a line of longitude east of the Greenwich Meridian
58th meridian west, a line of longitude west of the Greenwich Meridian